State Route 730 (SR 730) is a  north–south state highway in the southwestern quadrant of the U.S. state of Ohio.

Route description
All of SR 730 is situated in the western half of Clinton County.  This highway is not included within the National Highway System (NHS).  The NHS is a system of routes identified as being most important for the economy, mobility and defense of the country.

History
The SR 730 designation was applied in 1939.  The highway has maintained the same routing between SR 133 near Blanchester and the US 68/SR 134 concurrency in Wilmington throughout its lifespan.  When it was established, SR 730 was a gravel highway, excepting the northernmost  of the route, which were hard-surfaced.  Three years after its inception, the entire length of SR 730 was paved.

Major intersections

References

730
730